Events in the year 1881 in Portugal.

Incumbents
Monarch: Louis I
Prime Ministers: Braamcamp; Sampaio;  de Melo

Events
21 August – Portuguese legislative election, 1881.

Arts and entertainment

Sports

Births

27 December – António Granjo, lawyer and politician (died 1921)

Deaths

References

 
1880s in Portugal
Portugal
Years of the 19th century in Portugal
Portugal